Frederick Arthur Round Emney (12 February 1902 – 25 December 1980) was an English character actor and comedian.

Emney was born in Prescot, Lancashire, the son of Blanche (née Round) and Fred Emney, a music hall entertainer. His great-uncle was the actor Arthur Williams. Emney junior grew up in London and was educated at Cranleigh School.

He made his film debut in 1935, having previously worked in music hall. He became a familiar figure to screen audiences, usually playing the "posh fat bloke", usually gruff and invariably wearing a monocle. During the 1950s, he had his own television show which featured sketches and deft piano pieces often composed by him. Some were released on record. He had a short spell as straight man to puppets Pinky and Perky.

His sister Joan Emney was an actress who sometimes appeared with him in the same stage productions.

Fred Emney died in Bognor Regis, Sussex, on Christmas Day 1980.

Filmography

 A Man of Mayfair (1931) - (uncredited)
 Brewster's Millions (1935) - Freddy
 Come Out of the Pantry (1935) - Lord Axminster
 The Lilac Domino (1937) - Baron Ladislas de Gonda
 Let's Make a Night of It (1938) - Henry Boydell
 Jane Steps Out (1938) - General Wilton
 Hold My Hand (1938) - Lord Milchester
 Luck of the Navy (1938) - Cook
 Just like a Woman (1939) - Sir Charles Devoir
 Yes, Madam? (1939) - Sir Charles Drake-Drake
 She Couldn't Say No (1940) - Herbert
 The Middle Watch (1940) - Adm. Sir Reginald Hewett
 Just William (1940) - Mr. Brown
 Let the People Sing (1942) - Sir George Denberry-Baxter
 Fun at St. Fanny's (1955) - Dr. Jankers
 The Fast Lady (1962) - 1st Golfer
 A Home of Your Own (1964) - The Mayor
 Father Came Too! (1964) - Sir Francis Drake
 I've Gotta Horse (1965) - Lord Bentley
 Those Magnificent Men in Their Flying Machines (1965) - Colonel
 San Ferry Ann (1965) - Gourmet
 Bunny Lake Is Missing (1965) - Man in Soho
 The Sandwich Man (1966) - Sir Mervyn Moleskin
 Oliver! (1968) - Workhouse Chairman 
 The Assassination Bureau (1969) - Elevator Victim (uncredited)
 Lock Up Your Daughters! (1969) - Earl of Ware
 The Italian Job (1969) - Birkinshaw
 The Magic Christian (1969) - Fitzgibbon
 Under the Table You Must Go (1969) - Himself (documentary)
 Doctor in Trouble (1970) - Father
 Up the Chastity Belt (1971) - Mortimer
 Mistress Pamela (1974) - Dr. Livesey
 The Amorous Milkman (1975) - Magistrate
 Adventures of a Private Eye (1977) - Sir Basil (final film role)

References

External links

1902 births
1980 deaths
People educated at Cranleigh School
English male comedians
English male film actors
English male stage actors
English male television actors
Male actors from London
Music hall performers
20th-century English male actors
20th-century English comedians
People from Prescot